Where Angels Fear to Tread is a studio album by worship artist Matt Redman.

Track listing 
All songs written by Matt Redman, except where noted.
 "Amazing" – 3:05
 "Blessed Be Your Name" (Matt Redman, Beth Redman) – 5:06
 "Befriended" – 4:53
 "When My Heart Runs Dry" – 5:22
 "Making Melody" – 4:27
 "Call To Worship" – 4:40
 "Rejoice With Trembling" – 5:14
 "The Promise of Your Cross" – 4:08
 "Wonderful Maker" (Matt Redman, Chris Tomlin) – 4:58
 "Lord, Let Your Glory Fall" – 5:10
 "Where Angels Fear to Tread" (Matt Redman, Tom Lane) – 5:54
Total length – 53:01

Personnel 

 Matt Redman – lead vocals 
 Rythmic – keyboards, programming, guitars, additional bass, backing vocals 
 Mike Busbee – additional keyboards, programming, guitars, bass, backing vocals 
 Dana Weaver – additional guitar (1)
 Eli Thompson – bass 
 David Raven – drums
 John Catchings – cello 
 David Davidson – violin 
 John Mark Painter – string arrangements 
 Kendall Payne – backing vocals (3)

Group vocals

 Esther Alexander 
 Andy Argunda
 Mark Beswick
 Lou Fellingham
 James Gregory 
 Brenden Guyatt
 Priscilla Jones Campbell 

Various voices on "Making Melody"

 Raquel D'Olivera (Brazil)
 Rhona Armstrong-Abudu (Caribbean)
 Shelley-Ann Sydial (Caribbean)
 Eike Albert (Germany)
 Siu Mui Lam (Hong Kong)
 Yoon Park (Korea)
 Philip Beccles (Liberia)
 Felicia Hidajat (Malaysia)
 Dimeji Onabanjo (Nigeria)
 Tosin Okusanya (Nigeria)
 Johnny Larring (Norway)
 Ruth Larring (Norway)
 Simon Soderstroin (Sweden)
 Dave Wellington (UK)

Production

 Rythmic – producer, engineer at Sonikwire Studios, Irvine, California; Rythmic West, Pasadena, California; Rythmic East, Nashville, Tennessee; IHOF Studios, Nashville, Tennessee
 John Hartley – executive producer 
 Les Moir – executive producer 
 Mike Busbee – engineer, mixing at The Manor, Los Angeles, California
 Neil Costello – engineer (group vocals)
 Ken Love – mastering at MasterMix, Nashville, Tennessee
 Christiév Carothers – creative direction 
 Jan Cook – art direction 
 Benji Peck – art direction, design 
 Brandon Dickerson – photography

References 

Matt Redman albums
2002 albums
Survivor Records albums